The 7th European Athletics U23 Championships were held between 16 and 19 July 2009 in the S. Darius and S. Girėnas Stadium  in Kaunas, Lithuania.

Complete results and medal winners were published.

Men's results

Women's results

Medal table

Participation
According to an unofficial count, 901 athletes from 42 countries participated in the event.

 (2)
 (8)
 (1)
 (31)
 (17)
 (9)
 (8)
 (9)
 (22)
 (11)
 (15)
 (36)
 (72)
 (59)
 (48)
 (22)
 (22)
 (14)
 (6)
 (56)
 (23)
 (39)
 (1)
 (1)
 (1)
 (4)
 (1)
 (28)
 (15)
 (67)
 (16)
 (28)
 (61)
 (1)
 (3)
 (8)
 (6)
 (50)
 (23)
 (13)
 (16)
 (28)

References
General
Butcher, Michael (2009-07-17). European U23 Champs - Day One. IAAF. Retrieved on 2009-07-17.
Elbendir claims 5000 gold, Kokoyev wins Shot Put on Day 1 in Kaunas. European Athletics (2009-07-16). Retrieved on 2009-07-17.
Butcher, Michael (2009-07-18). European U23 Champs - Day Two (Archived 2009-07-25). IAAF. Retrieved on 2009-07-20.
Aikines-Aryeetey leads GB 1-2-3 in 100m final on Day 2 in Kaunas (Archived 2009-07-25). European Athletics (2009-07-17). Retrieved on 2009-07-20.
Butcher, Michael (2009-07-19). European U23 Champs - Day Three. IAAF. Retrieved on 2009-07-20.
Poland's Kszczot takes gold ahead of Lewandowski in 800 on Day 3 in Kaunas. European Athletics (2009-07-18). Retrieved on 2009-07-20.
Butcher, Michael (2009-07-20). European U23 Champs, Final Day. IAAF. Retrieved on 2009-07-20.
Russia finish top of medal table at European Athletics U23 Championships. European Athletics (2009-07-19). Retrieved on 2009-07-20.
Specific

External links
Results

 
European Athletics U23 Championships
European Athletics U23 Championships
Athletics U23 Championships
Athletics U23 Championships
2009 in Lithuanian sport
2009 in youth sport
July 2009 sports events in Europe
21st century in Kaunas